Neyveli Airport  is located in Neyveli, Tamil Nadu, India. The airport is owned by the Neyveli Lignite Corporation (NLC) and is located at National Highway 45C, adjacent to the NLC township. The airport is spread over 220 acres and has a 3000 square metre apron suitable for one ATR-72 sized aircraft. 
Vayudoot used to operate flights to Chennai Airport with their Dornier Do 228-100 from here in the 1990s but services were withdrawn after a while.

The Airports Authority of India is upgrading the airport to enable commencement of commercial flights under the Regional Connectivity Scheme (RCS) by the end of 2018. Civil work such as runway re-carpeting, construction of terminal building, etc., have been taken up.

References 

Airports in Tamil Nadu
Airports with year of establishment missing
Cuddalore district